Cristina Iovu (born 8 November 1992) is a Moldovan–born Azerbaijani-Romanian weightlifter competing in the –53 kg division. She is banned by the International Weightlifting Federation until 2026 for Blood substitution.

Career
Iovu won gold at the 2012 European Weightlifting Championships. At the 2012 London Olympics, Iovu originally won the bronze medal in the 53 kg event.

Iovu was disqualified from the 2013 World Weightlifting Championships after testing positive in competition for Oxandrolone and was sanctioned by the International Weightlifting Federation from 19 June 2013 to 19 June 2015. The Azerbaijani team was forced to pay $500,000 to the International Weightlifting Federation as multiple tests were positive for prohibited substances from the world anti-doping agency list.

In the 2016 European Championships Iovu represented the third country in her career - Romania.

On 27 July 2016 the International Weightlifting Federation announced that Iovu failed her re-tested 2012 Olympics sample. She tested positive for Dehydrochlormethyltestosterone (S1.1 Anabolic agents). In November 2016, she was stripped of her 2012 Olympic medal. She is facing another suspension and did not take part in the 2016 Rio Olympics.

On 2 November 2018, on the 2018 World Weightlifting Championships she got in Snatch 94-97-n/a and in Clean & Jerk, 116-118-123 got the bronze medal.

On 15 December 2018 she was banned until 2026 by the International Weightlifting Federation for Blood substitution.

References

External links
 
 
 
 

1992 births
Living people
Moldovan female weightlifters
Olympic weightlifters of Moldova
Weightlifters at the 2012 Summer Olympics
Sportspeople from Chișinău
Azerbaijani female weightlifters
Naturalized citizens of Azerbaijan
Romanian emigrants to Azerbaijan
Moldovan emigrants to Azerbaijan
Azerbaijani people of Romanian descent
Azerbaijani people of Moldovan descent
Romanian female weightlifters
Doping cases in weightlifting
Azerbaijani sportspeople in doping cases
Moldovan sportspeople in doping cases
Competitors stripped of Summer Olympics medals
Naturalised citizens of Romania
Moldovan expatriate sportspeople in Romania
Universiade medalists in weightlifting
Universiade silver medalists for Azerbaijan
European Weightlifting Championships medalists
World Weightlifting Championships medalists
Medalists at the 2013 Summer Universiade